Tiribrovo is a rural locality (a village) in Krasnoplamenskoye Rural Settlement, Alexandrovsky District, Vladimir Oblast, Russia. The population was 110 as of 2010. There are 2 streets.

Geography 
Tiribrovo is located 35 km northeast of Alexandrov (the district's administrative centre) by road. Mayovka is the nearest rural locality.

References 

Rural localities in Alexandrovsky District, Vladimir Oblast
Alexandrovsky Uyezd (Vladimir Governorate)